Torre Rise (Spanish for Rise Tower) is a under construction mixed-use supertall skyscraper in Monterrey, Mexico. With a height of  it aims to become one of the tallest buildings in the Americas upon completion.

Description

Rise Tower
Rise Tower is designed to be a 91 floor mixed use building and may host an 180-room hotel, office space, apartments, commercial spaces and an observation deck.

See also
List of tallest buildings in Mexico
List of tallest buildings in Latin America
List of supertall skyscrapers

References

Buildings and structures under construction in Mexico
Buildings and structures in Monterrey